Jetconnect Ltd. was a wholly owned subsidiary of Qantas that has its head office in Auckland, New Zealand. Originally established in July 2002 as a New Zealandbased airline, the company has since stopped operating as an airline but continues to employ pilots and cabin crew based at Auckland and Wellington airports. Crew employed by Jetconnect operate Qantas flights on trans-tasman services between Australia and New Zealand, with cabin crew also operating on Qantas long-haul flights alongside Australian-based crew.

History 
Jetconnect was established in July 2002, commencing operations in October the same year as a New Zealandbased airline. It operated domestic services within New Zealand until 10 June 2009, when these services were taken over by Jetstar Airways, another Qantas Group airline. Jetconnect then operated trans-tasman services between New Zealand and Australia under the Qantas brand with New Zealand-based crew.

From mid-2001 to early 2004, JetConnect operated a code-sharing agreement with Origin Pacific Airways. When this ceased, Origin lost 60% of their business.

In 2018, Jetconnect transferred its fleet of Boeing 737 aircraft back to Qantas and ceased to operate as an airline, though the company continued to employ pilots and cabin crew to operate trans-tasman services for Qantas.

Destinations

International short-haul 
Jetconnect short-haul pilots and cabin crew operate the majority of Qantas-marketed flights from Auckland, Christchurch, Queenstown and Wellington to Australian east-coast destinations.

 From Auckland
 Brisbane
 Melbourne
 Sydney
 From Christchurch
 Brisbane
 Melbourne
 Sydney
 From Wellington
 Melbourne
 Sydney
 From Queenstown
 Sydney
 Brisbane (seasonal)
 Melbourne (seasonal)

Domestic 
Jetconnect operated domestic flights in New Zealand until 9 June 2009. The final domestic service was QF2728 from Wellington to Auckland. Domestic services included routes between Auckland, Wellington, Rotorua, Christchurch and Queenstown. Services between Auckland, Christchurch, Queenstown and Wellington have been replaced with Jetstar services. Services to Rotorua were discontinued.

Fleet 

As of November 2018 all former Jetconnect aircraft had been transferred to Qantas.

Former fleet
Jetconnect previously operated the following Boeing 737 series aircraft:

 Boeing 737-300 (20022009)
 Boeing 737-400 (20062011)
 Boeing 737-800 (20092018)

Industrial relations
On 17 May 2006, the union representing Australian Qantas pilots, the Australian and International Pilots Association (AIPA), lodged an application to the Australian industrial relations commission Fair Work Australia, seeking to alter its eligibility rules to enable the enrolment of Jetconnect pilots in the union. On 23 May 2007 the commission ruled against the union, declining to consider the question, considering it inappropriate for the AIPA to be able to enrol New Zealand–based Jetconnect pilots, as they were already eligible to be members of the New Zealand Air Line Pilots' Association.

In December 2009 the AIPA took Jetconnect parent Qantas to Fair Work Australia, accusing the company of deliberately driving down wages and conditions, by undermining the spirit and intent of the Australian Fair Work Act. The AIPA accused Qantas of paying Jetconnect pilots 40 percent less than Qantas pilots, who six months earlier had been flying the majority of the airline's trans-Tasman services. Qantas was confident that it would win the case, stating: "These are New Zealand pilots operating New Zealand-originated services flying New Zealand-registered aircraft operated by a New Zealand entity".

In May 2010 Fair Work Australia president Justice Geoffrey Giudice agreed to convene a full bench to hear the application, and in July 2010 the Australian Council of Trade Unions (ACTU) was granted leave to intervene in the case after the ACTU argued that the outcome would have major ramifications for labour hire practice in Australia. The ACTU made its final submission regarding the case in March 2011, and in a majority decision handed down in September 2011 Fair Work Australia dismissed the AIPA's application.

In June 2011 the ABC program Hungry Beast produced a parody television advertisement for Qantas, highlighting the use of Jetconnect for its trans-Tasman flights.

See also
 List of defunct airlines of New Zealand
 History of aviation in New Zealand

References

External links

 Qantas official website (Jetconnect has no separate website)
 Jetconnect Recruitment Page

Defunct airlines of New Zealand
Qantas
Former Oneworld affiliate members
Airlines established in 2002
2018 disestablishments in New Zealand
New Zealand companies established in 2002